Berivotra may refer to:

Berivotra Formation - in the municipality Antanambao Andranolava, Boeny
Berivotra - a municipality in Betsiboka, Madagascar